Chernihiv Philharmony or the Chernihiv Oblast Philharmonic Centre for Festivals and Concerts is located just few meters from Krasna Square in the center of Chernihiv, Ukraine was founded in 1944. This building is an example of Russian Revival architecture that was popular at the turn of the 19th and 20th centuries.

History
First Philharmonic housed in the former convent Eletski. In August 1941, the building was burned during the Nazi bombings. In the postwar years Philharmonic has been restored with the superstructure 3rd floor. In 2000, the Chernihiv Regional Philharmonic Society was reorganized into the Regional Philharmonic Center festivals and concert programs.

Events
In 2014 Anna Binneweg made her European conducting young orchestra debut Chernihiv Philharmony.

Gallery

References

External links
  
 Official Website

Media
Facebook
Youtube
Instagram

Concert halls in Ukraine
Buildings and structures in Chernihiv
Tourist attractions in Chernihiv Oblast
Tourism in Chernihiv